is a Japanese professional football club based in Kyoto. "Sanga" comes from the Sanskrit word sangha, a term meaning "group" or "club" and often used to denote the Buddhist priesthood, associating the club with Kyoto's many Buddhist temples. The club was formerly known as Kyoto Purple Sanga with "purple", the colour of the team uniforms, an imperial colour reflecting Kyoto's status as Japan's ancient imperial capital city. It was decided that, from 2007, the team will simply be known as "Kyoto Sanga". They are the oldest club competing in the J.League.

History
The club was started as Kyoto Shiko Club, one of the few proper Japanese football clubs in the sense of being strictly dedicated to football and not being part of a company. Like Ventforet Kofu, it could not rise to a Japan Soccer League First Division dominated by company teams; in 1993, after the J.League was created, Kyoto Shiko Club, aided by funds from local new sponsors Kyocera and Nintendo, professionalized (though some players broke away and formed their own clubs, see below) and joined the former Japan Football League under the new name Kyoto Purple Sanga. 

First joining the J.League in 1996, Kyoto Sanga hold the dubious distinction of being the League's most relegated side, having been demoted on three separate occasions. Relegation to J2 occurred at the end of the 2000, 2003 and 2006 seasons; more than any other team. The 2003 relegation happened despite having many national team players such as Park Ji-sung and Daisuke Matsui on its roster and they eventually left for European clubs. 

In December 2007 the club gained J1 status for the fourth time in their history via the promotion/relegation playoff. A 0-2 home defeat to Urawa Reds on 14 November 2010 confirmed Sanga's relegation back to J2, bringing an end to their three-season spell in the top flight.

Record as J.League member

Key

Honours

League
J.League Division 2
2001, 2005
Kansai Soccer League
1969, 1971, 1979, 1988

Cups
Emperor's Cup
2002
All Japan Senior Football Championship
1988

Current squad

Out on loan

Reserve squad (U-18s)

Club captains

Naohiko Minobe 1994 
Makoto Sugiyama 1995 
Satoru Mochizuki 1996 
Ruy Ramos 1997 
Yuji Okuma 1997 
Hajime Moriyasu 1998 
Hisashi Kurosaki 1999 
Kazuyoshi Miura 2000 
Naoto Otake 2001 
Hiroshi Noguchi 2002 
Kiyotaka Ishimaru 2003–2004 
Daisuke Nakaharai 2005-2006
Daisuke Saito 2007 
Yuto Sato 2008-2009 
Atsushi Yanagisawa 2010 
Diego 2011 
Hiroki Nakayama 2012 
Jun Ando 2013 
Koji Yamase 2014 
Satoshi Yamaguchi 2015 
Takanori Sugeno 2016–2017 
Yuta Someya 2018 
Takumi Miyayoshi 2019 
Jun Ando 2020 
Temma Matsuda 2021–

Club officials
For the 2023 season.

Managerial history

Kit evolution

Related clubs
Amitie S.C. (Kansai Soccer League Division 1) – broke away from the original Kyoto Shiko Club upon professionalization; amateur club
Kyoto Shiko Club (Kansai Soccer League Division 2) – broke away from Kyoto BAMB 1993 (now Kyoto Amitie) in 1998; amateur club
Shiko Club women's (Kansai Women's Soccer League) – linked with today's Kyoto Shiko Club

Kyoto Sanga is considered the main continuation of the Kyoto Shiko Club that competed in the Japan Soccer League Second Division. "Shiko" (紫光) means "brilliant purple" and is the colour that Shiko/Sanga have always worn.

References

External links
 

 
J.League clubs
Japan Soccer League clubs
Football clubs in Japan
Association football clubs established in 1922
Emperor's Cup winners
Sport in Kyoto
1922 establishments in Japan
Japan Football League (1992–1998) clubs
Sports teams in Kyoto Prefecture